In the Footsteps of Alexander the Great is a BBC documentary television series, first shown in 1998. Written and presented by historian and broadcaster Michael Wood,
it retraced the travels of Alexander the Great, from Macedonia to the borders of India and back to Mesopotamia.

Controversy
Wood was prevented by the government of Greece from interviewing Eugene N. Borza, a professor specializing in the history of Macedonia, anywhere within Greece, apparently because of Borza's controversial views on the ethnic differences between the Greeks and Macedonians in ancient times. Borza later expressed approval of the series but was unhappy with the accompanying book.

Episode list
Episode one: Son of God

Macedonia to Turkey

First broadcast 14 July 1998

Episode two: Lord of Asia

Zagros to Persepolis

First broadcast 21 July 1998

Episode three: Across the Hindu Kush

The golden road to Samarkand

First broadcast 28 July 1998

Episode four: To The Ends of the Earth

Pakistan to Babylon

First broadcast 4 August 1998

See also 
In the Footsteps of Marco Polo

References

External links
 

1998 British television series debuts
1998 British television series endings
1990s British documentary television series
BBC television documentaries
1990s British television miniseries
English-language television shows